Olenegorsk may refer to:
Olenegorsk, Murmansk Oblast, a town in Murmansk Oblast, Russia
Olenya air base near it
Olenegorsk, Sakha Republic, a village (selo) in the Sakha Republic, Russia